Bezirk Gmunden is a district of the state of 
Upper Austria in Austria.

Municipalities 
Towns (Städte) are indicated in boldface; market towns (Marktgemeinden) in italics; suburbs, hamlets and other subdivisions of a municipality are indicated in small characters.
Altmünster
Bad Goisern
Bad Ischl
Ebensee
Gmunden
Gosau
Grünau im Almtal
Gschwandt
Hallstatt
Kirchham
Laakirchen
Obertraun
Ohlsdorf
Pinsdorf
Roitham
Sankt Konrad
Sankt Wolfgang im Salzkammergut
Scharnstein
Traunkirchen
Vorchdorf

External links 
 Official site

 
Districts of Upper Austria